The Blue Angel is an original novel written by Paul Magrs and Jeremy Hoad and based on the long-running British science fiction television series Doctor Who. It features the Eighth Doctor, Fitz, Compassion and Iris Wildthyme.

Notes
The novel has been dramatised by  Dr. Piers Britton for a design class at the University of Redlands, California. The setting and some of the characters from the Obverse Universe featured in the book were re-used by Philip Purser-Hallard in his Doctor Who short story "Cabinet of Changes".
In his review of the novel, Robert Shearman noted the striking similarity between the portrayal of Fitz and the then Conservative Party leader, William Hague. "Despite the plot pyrotechnics," he wrote, "there is a great deal of crossover between this novel, in its portrayal of a bygone England and the Conservative manifesto of the last general election.".

References

External links
The Cloister Library - The Blue Angel
Script of The Blue Angel dramatisation

Reviews
The Whoniverse's review on The Blue Angel

1999 British novels
1999 science fiction novels
Eighth Doctor Adventures
Novels by Paul Magrs
British science fiction novels